CSCR may refer to:
 Complexe sportif Claude-Robillard
 Central serous chorioretinopathy
 Carbon selective catalytic reduction